Mircea Mureșan (11 November 1928 – 24 April 2020) was a Romanian film director. He directed 22 films between 1961 and 2004. Mureșan won the prize for Best First Work at the 1966 Cannes Film Festival for the film Răscoala.

Born in Sibiu, he attended from 1939 to 1947 the Gheorghe Lazăr High School in his native city. He then played at the State Theatre of Sibiu for four years, after which he went to Bucharest to pursue his studies, graduating from the Institute of Film I.L. Caragiale in 1955. 

His film career, which began with film adaptations, gradually reoriented towards comedy, with rare trips into documentaries. From 1974 to 1989 Mureșan was vice-president of the Romanian Filmmakers Association.

He was married to actress .

Filmography

 Toamna se numără bobocii, 1961 (screenwriter, with András Sütő)
 , 1963
 Răscoala, 1965
 K.O., 1968 (screenwriter, with Eugen Popiță)
 , 1969 (scenario after Mihail Sadoveanu's eponymous novel)
 Lunga noapte de șase ani, 1970 (documentary, has been destroyed)
 , 1970 (screenwriter, with Corneliu Leu)
 , 1972
 , 1973
 Toate pînzele sus, 1976 (for TV; screenwriter, with Alexandru Struțeanu)
 , 1977
 Blestemul pământului, blestemul iubirii, 1979
 , 1981 (screenwriter)
 , 1981–1982 (for TV; with Andrei Blaier and Mihai Constantinescu)
 O lebădă, iarna, 1983
 , 1984
 Cei mai frumoși 20 de ani, 1985
 , 1988
 , 1991
 , 1994
 , 2001 (screenwriter)
 Vrăjitoarea Azucena – Îngerul de abanos, 2004 (screenwriter)

References

External links

1928 births
2020 deaths
Romanian film directors
People from Sibiu
Caragiale National University of Theatre and Film alumni
Romanian screenwriters